David Müller (born 22 December 1984) is a German retired footballer

In August 2009, his transfer to Sportfreunde Siegen was confirmed. In January 2010, Müller joined TSV Germania Windeck. In July 2011, he moved to FC Viktoria Köln 1904. In 2014, he moved to SSVg Velbert.

References

1984 births
Living people
Sportspeople from Leverkusen
German footballers
Bayer 04 Leverkusen II players
FC Schalke 04 II players
Rot-Weiß Oberhausen players
VfR Aalen players
TuRU Düsseldorf players
FC Viktoria Köln players
2. Bundesliga players
3. Liga players
Association football midfielders
Footballers from North Rhine-Westphalia
SSVg Velbert players
Sportfreunde Siegen players